Jože Zidar (7 September 1927 – 25 December 2012) was a Slovenian ski jumper. He competed in the individual event at the 1956 Winter Olympics.

References

1927 births
2012 deaths
Slovenian male ski jumpers
Olympic ski jumpers of Yugoslavia
Ski jumpers at the 1956 Winter Olympics
Sportspeople from Jesenice, Jesenice